Renée Willett is an American actress, comedian, and producer known for The Comedian, Blind, and Sharknado 3: Oh Hell No!.

Early life and education 
Willett was born and raised in New York City and has two younger siblings. She attended IMG Academy, a tennis-focused boarding school. Willett graduated from the University of Southern California with a Bachelor of Arts degree in economics, Spanish, and theatre.

She later trained in performing arts at the William Esper Studio in New York and in Los Angeles with the Upright Citizens Brigade and the Groundlings. Willett later earned a Master of Business Administration from the USC Marshall School of Business.

Career 

Willett made her film debut in the third installment of the Sharknado series in 2015. She later appeared as Ashley in The Comedian. In 2016, Willett was cast in the indie film Blind. Renée later produced the film The Yellow Birds.

In 2018, Willett acted in the drama Beast of Burden, and acted and produced the film Run With The Hunted.

Willett has also performed stand-up comedy.

Filmography

Film

Television

References

External links
 

Living people
University of Southern California alumni
American film actresses
Year of birth missing (living people)
21st-century American women